AVC-Intra is a type of video coding developed by Panasonic, and then supported in products made by other companies.
AVC-Intra is available in Panasonic's high definition broadcast products, such as, for example, their P2 card equipped broadcast cameras.

Technical details
Panasonic announced AVC-Intra codec support in April 2007. The use of AVC-Intra provides production quality HD video at bit rates more normally associated with electronic news gathering applications, permitting full resolution, 10-bit field capture of high quality HD imagery in one piece camera-recorders.

AVC-Intra is compliant with the H.264/MPEG-4 AVC standard
and Panasonic claims to follow the SMPTE RP 2027–2007 recommended practice specification. Analysis by the x264 project has shown that Panasonic does not comply with this specification

AVC-Intra was intended for video professionals who have to store HD digital video for editing and archiving. It defines 10-bit intra-frame only compression, which is easy for editing and preserves maximum video quality. The technology significantly outperforms the older HDV (MPEG2 based) and DVCPRO HD (DV based) formats, allowing the codec in certain conditions to maintain better quality in half the storage space of DVCPRO HD.

AVC-Intra defines two classes:
 AVC-Intra 50:
 nominally 50 Mbit/s, size of each frame is fixed
 CABAC entropy coding only.
 1920 × 1080 formats are High 10 Intra Profile, Level 4
 1280 × 720 formats are High 10 Intra Profile, Level 3.2
 4:2:0 chrominance sampling
 frames are horizontally scaled by 3/4 (1920x1080 is scaled to 1440x1080. 1280 × 720 is scaled to 960x720)
 AVC-Intra 100:
 nominally 100 Mbit/s, size of each frame is fixed
 CAVLC entropy coding only.
 All formats are High 4:2:2 Intra Profile, Level 4.1
 4:2:2 chrominance sampling
 frames are not scaled

Common to both classes;
 Frame rates: 1920 × 1080 (23.98p / 25p / 29.97p / 50i / 59.94i), 1280 × 720 (23.98p / 25p / 29.97p / 50p / 59.94p)
 10 bit luma and chroma

Panasonic's implementation of AVC-Intra codec has following limitations: 8 × 8 transform only, 8 × 8 intra prediction only, 10 slices per picture, MBAFF for interlace material, custom quantization matrices for each class and each resolution.

AVC-Ultra

The Panasonic AVC-Ultra family defines an additional three new encoding parameters within the MPEG-4 Part 10 standard, utilizing up to the 4:4:4 Intra Predictive Profile, as well as an additional low bitrate proxy recording mode.

The most efficient new parameter within AVC-Ultra is by Panasonic called, AVC-LongG. AVC-LongG enables compression of video resolutions up to 1920 × 1080 @ 23.97, 25 and 29.97p, with 10 bits of pixel depth at 4:2:2 color sampling, at data rates as low as 25 Mbit / sec.

More over, the AVC-Intra Class 50/100 is now extended to Class 200 and Class 4:4:4. The Class 200 mode extends the bitrate to 226 Mbit / sec for 1080/23,97p, while the Class 4:4:4 extends the possible resolution from 720p to 4K with pixel depths at 10 and 12 bits.

The bitrate settings for Class 4:4:4 varies between 200 and 440 Mbit / sec depending on the resolution, frame rate and bit depth. Both the Class 200 and the Class 4:4:4 are Intra-only coding modes.

The AVC-Proxy mode enables extremely fast ENG content delivery and offline edits of 720p and 1080p video at bitrates varying between 800 Kbit to 3.5 Mbit / sec at 8 bits of pixel depth.

More recent information about AVC-Ultra (including the new 10-bit and 12-bit Class4:4:4, Class2K4:2:2, Class2K4:4:4, Class4K4:2:2, and Class4K4:4:4) is available on Panasonic's AVC-Ultra Page.

Third-party support
 Avid's Media Composer since v 3.5.0 provides support via Avid Media Access (AMA), a new plug-in architecture
 Apple's Final Cut Pro 7 provides native AVC-Intra decoding within a ProRes 422 timeline. 
 Apple's Final Cut Pro X provides native editing of AVC-Intra, including AVC-Intra 100 and AVC-Intra 50, as well as AVC-LongG, with support for import and playback without transcoding within a ProRes 422 timeline.
 MXF4mac offers an AVC-Intra codec for QuickTime that allows to export AVC-Intra and to set up native AVC-Intra timelines in Final Cut Pro.
 EVS Broadcast Equipment has announced AVC-Intra 100 support for their XT[2]+, XT[3] and XS server family
 MainConcept offer an AVC-Intra encoder and decoder as part of their Codec SDK
 Harris Corporation announced AVC-Intra support for the NEXIO AMP line of video servers at NAB 2008
 Omneon announced AVC-Intra support for their Spectrum and MediaDeck products in 2007.
 Quantel demonstrated AVC-Intra workflow at NAB 2007, and released to customers in 2008 with their V4 software.
 Grass Valley has announced native support for AVC-Intra in Edius 4.5
 Adobe's After Effects CS5 provides native AVC-Intra decoding.
 Vanguard Software Solutions provides an H.264/AVC PC SDK capable of encoding at 100 Mbit/s in real-time
 FFmpeg and Libav support decoding of both forms of AVC-Intra
 ATEME AVC-I Contribution Encoders
 x264 can encode AVC-Intra 
 Broadcast products based on SHINE Media Platform of GammaRED Engineering

Several companies introduced AVC Intra codec semiconductor intellectual property cores.
 CoreEL Technologies (http://www.coreel.com) provides AVC-Intra Class 50 and AVC-Intra Class 100 IP cores.
 Tata Elxsi (http://www.tataelxsi.com) provides AVC-Intra & AVC-Ultra fully optimizable class 50 and 100 IP.
 Vanguard Software Solutions provides AVC-Intra 50 and 100 encoder IP (up to AVC-Ultra: 1080p60 at 300 Mbit/s).
 Nethra Imaging provides AVC-Intra 50 and 100 encoder IP.

References

Panasonic
High-definition television
MPEG-4
Video codecs
Video compression